The Brasília tapaculo (Scytalopus novacapitalis) is a species of bird in the family Rhinocryptidae. It is endemic to southern Brazil.

Taxonomy and systematics

The Brasilia tapaculo is most closely related to the Planalto tapaculo (Scytalopus pachecoi). Those two species, rock tapaculo (S. petrophilus), and Diamantina tapaculo (S. diamantinensis) form a clade. It was originally thought to be closely related to the white-breasted tapaculo (Eleoscytalopus indigoticus).

Description

The adult is blue-gray above and whitish to pale gray below. The lower back and rump are reddish brown and the vent is rufous with gray barring. The juvenile has not been described.

Distribution and habitat

The Brasilia tapaculo is found in disjunct areas in eastern Goiás, the Distrito Federal, and western Minas Gerais. It inhabits gallery forest, primarily permanently flooded areas with Blechnum ferns and Euterpe palms.

Behavior

Feeding

The Brasilia tapaculo forages on the ground for insects, spiders, and centipedes.

Breeding

The only information on the Brasilia tapaculo's breeding phenology is that a specimen collected in July had active gonads.

Vocalization

The Brazilia tapaculo's song is an "ewk" note repeated for up to a minute . Its alarm call  is a series of sharp "che-te-te" notes. Another call is a fast series of "chip" notes that increase in volume.

Status

The IUCN has assessed the Brasilia tapaculo as Endangered. Its range of approximately 72 km2 (28 mi2) is greatly fragmented and under continued threat of degradation. It does, however, occur in at least six protected areas.

References

Brasília tapaculo
Birds of the Cerrado
Endemic birds of Brazil
Brasília tapaculo
Brasília tapaculo
Taxonomy articles created by Polbot